Events in the year 1863 in Belgium.

Incumbents
Monarch: Leopold I
Head of government: Charles Rogier

Events
 9 April – Treaty of amity, commerce and navigation with the Kingdom of Italy signed in Turin.
 12 May – Commercial treaty with the Netherlands, including Dutch agreement to perpetual abolition of tolls on the Scheldt river in return for a payment of 17 million guilders
 20 May – Commercial treaty with the United States, bringing relations into line with the free trade agreements already signed with France (1861), the United Kingdom (1862) and the Netherlands (1863).
 9 June – Partial legislative elections of 1863
 16 July – Multilateral treaty for the redemption of the Scheldt tolls signed in Brussels
 27 July – Commercial treaty with the Austrian Empire, bringing relations into line with the free trade agreements already signed with France (1861), the United Kingdom (1862) and the Netherlands (1863).
 1 August – Clipper Marnix van Sinte-Aldegonde the first ship to sail toll-free from Antwerp to the mouth of the Scheldt.
 11 August – State visit of Queen Victoria to Belgium.
 18-22 August – First Catholic Congress in Mechelen.
 Guild of Saint Thomas and Saint Luke for the study and promotion of Christian art founded
 19 September – Convention modifying the 1852 postal convention between Belgium and the Office of the Prince of Tour and Taxis signed in Brussels.
 26 December – Solvay chemical company founded.

Publications
Periodicals
 Annuaire de l'Observatoire Royal de Bruxelles, vol. 31
 La Belgique horticole, edited by Édouard Morren
 Bulletin du Bibliophile Belge, vol. 19, edited by A. Scheler (Brussels, F. Heussner)
 Bulletins de l'Académie royale des sciences, des lettres et des beaux-arts de Belgique, second series, vol. 15
 Collection de précis historiques, vol. 12, edited by Edouard Terwecoren S.J.
 Revue belge et étrangère, 15
 Revue Trimestrielle, vol. 38
 Le Timbre-Poste begins publication

Studies and reports
 Prosper de Haulleville, Les Catholiques et les libertés constitutionnelles en Belgique
 Émile de Laveleye, Essai sur l'économie rurale de la Belgique

Historical editions
 Louis Galesloot, Procès de François Anneessens: doyen du corps des métiers de Bruxelles, vol. 2 (Brussels and The Hague)
 Jehan le Bel, Les vrayes chroniques, edited by Lambert Polain, vol. 1

Art and architecture
Performances
 3 January – First performance of Charles Hugo's stage adaptation of Les Misèrables, Théâtre Royal des Galeries, Brussels

Births
 10 January – Félix Wielemans, soldier (died 1917)
 3 February – Charles Magnette, politician (died 1937)
 8 March – Théophile Bovy, journalist (died 1937)
 3 April – Henry van de Velde, painter (died 1957)
 21 April – Paul Lebrun, composer (died 1920)
 25 June – Émile Francqui, philanthropist (died 1935)
 26 June
 Paul Pelseneer, biologist (died 1945)
 Henri Quersin, marksman (died 1944)
 13 August – Pol Demade, writer (died 1936)
 21 August – Jules Destrée, politician (died 1936) 
 1 September – Herman Baltia, soldier (died 1938)
 14 November – Leo Baekeland, chemist (died 1944)
 10 December – Maurice Hennequin, playwright (died 1926)

Deaths
 8 February – Martin Martens (born 1797), botanist and chemist
 14 May – Emmanuel Noterman (born 1808), painter
 18 July – Arnold Timothée de Lasaulx (born 1774), politician
 19 July – André-Napoléon Fontainas (born 1807), politician
 26 September – Jean Thienpont (born 1774), politician
 31 October – Augustus Van Dievoet (born 1803), judge

References

 
Belgium
Years of the 19th century in Belgium
1860s in Belgium
Belgium